Sympterygia is a genus of fish in the family Arhynchobatidae found in oceans off South America.

Species
There are four species in the genus:
 Sympterygia acuta Garman, 1877 (Bignose fanskate)
 Sympterygia bonapartii J. P. Müller and Henle, 1841 (Smallnose fanskate)
 Sympterygia brevicaudata Cope, 1877 (Shorttail fanskate)
 Sympterygia lima Poeppig, 1835 (Filetail fanskate)

References

 
Rajidae
Ray genera
Taxa named by Johannes Peter Müller
Taxa named by Friedrich Gustav Jakob Henle
Taxonomy articles created by Polbot